George Linder was a reverend and  state representative in Georgia. He was elected to represent Laurens County in the Georgia House of Representatives during the Reconstruction era but was expelled along with the other elected African Americans. He and other African Americans were expelled. He was documented as a farmworker.

He founded the Strawberry AME Church in 1857.

See also
Original 33

References

Year of birth missing (living people)
Living people